Màiri Louise McAllan (born 14 February 1993) is a Scottish politician serving as Minister for Environment, Biodiversity and Land Reform since May 2021. A member of the Scottish National Party (SNP), she has been the Member of the Scottish Parliament (MSP) for Clydesdale since 2021. McAllan is a former solicitor, who served as a special advisor to First Minister Nicola Sturgeon.

Early life
McAllan grew up and was educated in Biggar, South Lanarkshire, then studied Scots law at the University of Glasgow, also spending time at the University of Ghent in Belgium.

Her father Ian is also a politician who has served as a local councillor for South Lanarkshire's Clydesdale East ward (which covers Biggar) since 2017.

Political career
She stood unsuccessfully in Dumfriesshire, Clydesdale and Tweeddale at the 2017 United Kingdom general election.

On 6 May 2021 she was elected as Member of the Scottish Parliament (MSP) for Clydesdale.

On 19 May 2021, McAllan was appointed to the new government as Minister for Environment, Biodiversity and Land Reform.

References

External links 
 

Date of birth missing (living people)
1993 births
Living people
Scottish National Party MSPs
Ministers of the Scottish Government
Members of the Scottish Parliament 2021–2026
Female members of the Scottish Parliament
Scottish expatriates in Belgium
Scottish National Party parliamentary candidates
People from Biggar, South Lanarkshire
Alumni of the University of Glasgow
Politicians from South Lanarkshire